Jack Patrick Dorsey (born November 19, 1976) is an American Internet entrepreneur and programmer who is a co-founder and former CEO of Twitter, Inc., as well as co-founder, principal executive officer and chairperson of Block, Inc., the developer of the Square financial services platform.

Early life 
Dorsey was born and raised in St. Louis, Missouri, the son of Tim and Marcia (née Smith) Dorsey. He is of part-Italian descent on his mother's side. His father worked for a company that developed mass spectrometers and his mother was a homemaker. He was raised Catholic, and his uncle is a Catholic priest in Cincinnati.

Dorsey attended Bishop DuBourg High School. In his younger days, he worked occasionally as a fashion model. By age 14, he had become interested in dispatch routing. Dorsey enrolled at the University of Missouri–Rolla in 1995 and attended for two-plus years before transferring to New York University in 1997, but he dropped out two years later, one semester short of graduating. He came up with the idea that eventually became Twitter while studying at NYU.

While working on dispatching as a programmer, Dorsey moved to California. In 2000, Dorsey started his company in Oakland to dispatch couriers, taxis, and emergency services from the Web. His other projects and ideas at this time included networks of medical devices and a "frictionless service market". In July 2000, building on dispatching and inspired in part by LiveJournal and by AOL Instant Messenger, he had the idea for a Web-based realtime status/short message communication service.

When he first saw implementations of instant messaging, Dorsey wondered whether the software's user status output could be shared easily among friends. He approached Odeo, which at the time happened to be interested in text messaging. Dorsey and Biz Stone decided that SMS text suited the status-message idea, and built a prototype of Twitter in about two weeks. The idea attracted many users at Odeo and investment from Evan Williams, a co-founder of that firm in 2005 who had left Google after selling Pyra Labs and Blogger.

Career

Twitter 

Noah Glass, Evan Williams, and Biz Stone  co-founded Odeo, later renamed Obvious Corporation, which then spun off Twitter, Inc. Dorsey became Twitter's Chief Executive Officer (CEO). As CEO, Dorsey saw the startup through two rounds of funding by venture capitalists. He reportedly lost his position for leaving work early to enjoy other pursuits, such as yoga and fashion design.

As the service began to grow in popularity, Dorsey chose the improvement of uptime as top priority, even over creating revenue—which, as of 2008, Twitter was not designed to earn. Dorsey described the commercial use of Twitter and its API as two things that could lead to paid features. His three guiding principles, which he says the company shares, are simplicity, constraint, and craftsmanship.

On October 16, 2008, Williams took over as CEO, while Dorsey became chairman of the board. During his time as chairman, Dorsey joined several State Department delegations, including a trip to Iraq in April 2009, led by Jared Cohen. In November, when Iranians took to the streets in the Green Revolution, Twitter was scheduled to conduct maintenance of its site, which would entail temporarily shutting down Twitter's servers. Dorsey responded to a request from Cohen to delay the maintenance so that it would not affect the revolution in Iran, because Iranians were using Twitter to communicate and coordinate. Since President Obama had announced that there would be no meddling in Iran, the move sparked controversy. In February 2010, Dorsey was part of another State Department delegation, this time to Russia. On March 28, 2011, he returned to Twitter as executive chairman after Dick Costolo replaced Williams as CEO. On June 10, 2015, Costolo announced his resignation as CEO, effective July 1, 2015. Dorsey assumed the post of interim CEO upon Costolo's departure. He was named permanent CEO on October 5, 2015.

In May 2016, Dorsey announced that Twitter would not count photos and links in the 140-character limit to free up more space for text. This was an attempt to entice new users, since the number of tweets per day had dropped from about 500 million in September 2013 and its peak of 661 million in August 2014 to about 300 million in January 2016.

On November 22, 2016, Dorsey was briefly suspended from his own Twitter account with 3.9 million followers. After restoring the account, Dorsey tweeted that the suspension was due to an "internal mistake".

In February 2017, Dorsey and Executive Chairman Omid Kordestani matched a $530,000 donation to the American Civil Liberties Union (ACLU) raised by Twitter staffers. Their match brought the total donation to $1.59 million.

In March 2018, Dorsey announced that an improved version of the verification system would be coming to Twitter. The purpose of redesigning verification was to let people verify more facts about themselves, emphasizing proof of identity. The overhaul was not in place before the U.S midterm election of 2018 to help in verifying the identities of the candidates.

In September 2018, Dorsey testified before the Senate Intelligence Committee alongside Facebook COO Sheryl Sandberg about meddling in the 2016 presidential election. Following this testimony, Twitter shares fell six percent.

Dorsey met privately with U.S. President Donald Trump at the White House and discussed Trump's concerns that Twitter had limited or removed some of his Twitter followers, and those of conservatives. After the meeting, Dorsey tweeted that their discussion included making Twitter "healthier and more civil". A week earlier, Dorsey took part in a TED talk about the social media platform's spread of abuse and misinformation, which has brought him criticism.

On August 30, 2019, Dorsey's personal Twitter account was allegedly breached for nearly an hour by a group calling itself the Chuckling Squad, posting and retweeting numerous racist tweets.

On October 23, 2019, Twitter's stock price fell by nearly 24 percent, from $38.83 to $30.75. The reason was an earnings miss off a third quarter report, which Twitter blamed on ad targeting problems. Dorsey had been making a concerted effort to dampen the effect that Twitter had on political elections, which entailed banning all political ads. This was also seen as a large contributor to the drop. Dorsey announced that, as of November 22, 2019, Twitter would ban all political advertising. The policy applies globally to all marketing campaigns about political issues.

On February 29, 2020, it was announced that activist hedge fund Elliott Management led by billionaire Paul Singer was looking to oust Dorsey and nominate four directors to Twitter's board, including Elliott's senior portfolio manager Jesse Cohn. The two parties reached an agreement days later, with Dorsey remaining CEO.

In October 2020, Dorsey was one of several tech firm CEOs subpoenaed by the US Senate Commerce Committee. Republican Roger Wicker, who chairs the committee, led the charge to force the CEOs of Twitter, Facebook and Google to testify about the legal immunity the tech platforms receive under Section 230 of the Communications Act of 1996.

He announced his departure from the role of Twitter's CEO on November 29, 2021. His resignation was effective immediately. Dorsey was replaced by the company's former CTO Parag Agrawal, who took over as CEO effective immediately. Dorsey will continue to lead as the CEO of Block, Inc. In May 2022, Dorsey left the board of directors of the social network.

In October 2022, Dorsey retained his 2.4% ownership of Twitter when the company was sold to Elon Musk.

Block 

Dorsey, along with co-founder Jim McKelvey, developed a small business platform to accept debit and credit card payments on a mobile device called Square, released in May 2010. The small, square-shaped device attaches to iPhone, iPad, iPod Touch, or Android devices via the headphone jack, and as a mini card reader, allows a person to swipe their card, choose an amount to transfer to the recipient and then sign their name for confirmation. Square is also a system for sending paperless receipts via text message or email, and is available as a free app for iOS and Android OS. The company grew from 10 employees in December 2009 to over 100 by June 2011. Square's office is on Market Street in San Francisco. In September 2012, Business Insider magazine valued Square Inc. at US$3.2 billion. Dorsey is CEO of Square, Inc. On October 14, 2015, Square filed for an IPO to be listed on the New York Stock Exchange. As of that date, Dorsey owned 24.4 percent of the company. In March 2020 the FDIC permitted Square to open a bank. It announced plans to launch Square Financial Services in 2021.

In May 2020, Dorsey announced that employees of Square would permanently become remote workers.

In 2020, Square began withholding for months up to 30 percent of the funds that merchants collected from customers using its Cash App.

On December 1, 2021, CEO Jack Dorsey officially changed the name of the platform to Block, Inc. This was due in part to his interest in the blockchain as well as the new name encompassing the various businesses better than the current name, which is mostly associated with its merchant-payment services. The stock ticker for Block, Inc. would remain "SQ".

Bluesky 
Dorsey is a co-founder of Bluesky, a Twitter spin-off developing a decentralized social networking protocol and app.

Other projects 
In 2013, Dorsey expressed to CNN an admiration for Michael Bloomberg, and said that he aspires to become mayor of New York City. He served as a judge for Bloomberg's NYC BigApps competition in 2011.

On December 24, 2013, Dorsey was announced as a new member of the board of directors of The Walt Disney Company. In January 2018, it was reported that Dorsey would not seek reelection at Disney's March annual meeting, due to increased difficulty with conflicts of interest.

Dorsey is a board member of the Berggruen Institute's Governance Center. Dorsey gives advice in a chapter of Tim Ferriss' book Tools of Titans.

Dorsey is a vocal Bitcoin advocate, and has spoken at Bitcoin conferences such as "The B Word". He has said that if he were not working on Twitter and Square, he would be working on Bitcoin.

He also endorses and financially supported the development of the Nostr social networking protocol.

Personal life 
In 2012, Dorsey moved to the Sea Cliff neighborhood of San Francisco.

Meditation 
In 2015, Dorsey said he began his mornings with meditation. In late 2017, Dorsey completed ten days of meditation known as Vipassanā taught by followers of S. N. Goenka. In November 2018, Dorsey went on a birthday Vipassanā meditation trip to Myanmar.

Politics 
In 2019, Dorsey contributed financially to the campaigns of Democratic 2020 presidential candidates Tulsi Gabbard and Andrew Yang.

In 2020, he donated $15 million to 29 mayors pursuing the piloting of guaranteed basic income programs in the United States.

Until 2021, Dorsey applied "world leader" exceptions that enabled President Donald Trump to post content on Twitter that would normally be removed or generate sanctions per the platform's rules. In May 2020, some of Trump's tweets received warning labels, and from Election Day in November 2020, more flaggings were applied to his tweets. On January 6, 2021, after pro-Trump supporters stormed the U.S. Capitol, Twitter applied a 12-hour timeout to Trump's account for violating its Civic Integrity policy. Trump's account was suspended permanently on January 8. On January 14, Dorsey defended banning Trump, but also said it "sets a precedent I feel is dangerous." On November 19, 2022, Twitter reinstated Trump's account following Elon Musk's purchase of the platform.

Philanthropic and other donations 
In March 2016, Dorsey fully funded about 600 Missouri public school projects registered at DonorsChoose.

In October 2019, Dorsey donated $350,000 to #TeamTrees, a nonprofit started by YouTuber MrBeast that pledged to plant 20 million trees by the end of 2019.

On April 7, 2020, Dorsey announced that he would move about $1 billion of his equity in Square, Inc., just under a third of his total wealth, to Start Small, LLC, and to relief programs related to the coronavirus. He committed to funding COVID-19 relief, girls' education and health, and universal basic income. Dorsey has donated $24 million to over 40 different grantees for relief efforts.

In August 2020, Dorsey donated $10 million to Boston University's Center for Antiracist Research, founded by Ibram X. Kendi.

In May 2021, he donated $15 million to support relief efforts in India's COVID-19 second wave. The three NGOs were Care ($10 million), Aid India ($2.5 million), and Sewa International ($2.5 million).

Awards and recognition 
 In 2008, he was named to the MIT Technology Review TR35 as one of the top 35 innovators in the world under the age of 35.
 In 2012, The Wall Street Journal gave him the "Innovator of the Year Award" for technology.
 At the 5th Annual Crunchies Awards in 2012, hosted by TechCrunch, Dorsey was named Founder of the Year.
 In 2013, he was considered by Forbes the world's most eligible bachelor.
 Dorsey was ranked by Fox Business as the #4 Worst CEO of 2016, citing stagnant growth, falling stock prices, and his part-time commitment to Twitter.
 In 2017, 24/7 Wall St. listed Dorsey among the 20 Worst CEOs in America.

References

Further reading

External links

 
 
 

1976 births
Living people
Businesspeople from St. Louis
Businesspeople from San Francisco
Catholics from California
Catholics from Missouri
Directors of Twitter, Inc.
Twitter, Inc. people
Block, Inc. employees
American billionaires
American male bloggers
American bloggers
American investors
American computer businesspeople
American computer programmers
American corporate directors
American people of Italian descent
American technology company founders
American technology chief executives
Directors of The Walt Disney Company
People associated with cryptocurrency
Students of S. N. Goenka
Missouri University of Science and Technology alumni
New York University alumni
New York University people
20th-century American businesspeople
21st-century American businesspeople